Nguyễn Hải An  (born 15 June 1988) is a Vietnamese footballer who plays as a midfielder for V.League 2 club Đồng Tháp.

Honours

Clubs

Hà Nội F.C.
V.League 1
 Winners :       2013, 2016
 Runners-up :  2011, 2012, 2014, 2015
 Third place : 2017
Vietnamese Super Cup
 Runners-up : 2013, 2015, 2016
Vietnamese National Cup
 Runners-up : 2012, 2015, 2016
AFC Cup    :
Quarter-finals 2014 AFC Cup

References 

1988 births
Living people
Vietnamese footballers
Association football midfielders
V.League 1 players
Hanoi FC players